British Guiana (now Guyana) competed at the 1948 Summer Olympics in London, England. Four competitors, all men, took part in seven events in three sports. It was the first time that the nation competed at the Olympic Games.

Athletics

Cycling

One cyclist represented British Guiana in 1948.

Individual road race
 Laddie Lewis

Sprint
 Laddie Lewis

Time trial
 Laddie Lewis

Weightlifting

References

External links
Official Olympic Reports

Nations at the 1948 Summer Olympics
1948 Summer Olympics
Sport in British Guiana
Summer Olympics